The Myanmar Futsal League  is the top league for futsal clubs in Myanmar. It is sponsored by Myanmar and therefore officially known as the MFF Myanmar Futsal League.

Clubs 
Competition of 10 club in 2017 league
 MIU
 Myoma Futsal Club
 Pyay United
 Titans XII Futsal Club
 UM Futsal Club
 UPT Futsal Club
 Victoria University College Futsal Club
 White Colour Futsal Club
 Yamonnya Futsal Club
 Yangon City Futsal Club

Championship History

See also 
 Myanmar national futsal team

References

External links 
Official website
Football Association of Myanmar

Fut
MYA